Stephanie Puckrin (born 22 August 1979) is an association football goalkeeper who represented New Zealand at international level.

Puckrin made her full Football Ferns debut in a 6-1 World Cup qualifying win over Tonga on 9 April 2007, and was included in the New Zealand squad for the 2007 FIFA Women's World Cup finals in China, where they lost to Brazil 0–5, Denmark (0-2) and China (0-2). Puckrin failed to get playing time at the tournament with Jenny Bindon being first choice goalkeeper.

References

External links

1979 births
Living people
New Zealand women's international footballers
New Zealand women's association footballers
Women's association football goalkeepers
2007 FIFA Women's World Cup players